The Kirby 30 is a Canadian racing sailboat, that was designed by Bruce Kirby and first built in 1981.

The Kirby 30 design was a follow-on to the Kirby 25 and it was later developed into the Mirage 30 SX in 1985.

Production
The boat was built by Mirage Yachts in Canada, starting in 1981. The company completed 195 examples, but it is now out of production.

Design
The Kirby 30 is a small recreational racing keelboat, built predominantly of fibreglass. It has a fractional sloop rig, an internally-mounted spade-type rudder and a fixed fin keel. It displaces  and carries  of ballast.

The boat has a PHRF racing average handicap of 135 with a high of 142 and low of 132.

Operational history
In a 1980 review in Canadian Yachting, John Turnbull described the design as, "Not your average thirty. If you need standing headroom. forget it. But if you love to sail, and sail fast".

See also
List of sailing boat types

Related development
Kirby 25
Mirage 30 SX

Similar sailboats
Cal 9.2 
C&C 30
C&C 30 Redwing
Catalina 30
Catalina 309
CS 30
Grampian 30
Hunter 29.5
Hunter 30
Hunter 30T
Hunter 30-2
Hunter 306
J/30
Mirage 30
Nonsuch 30
S2 9.2
Santana 30/30

References

Keelboats
1980s sailboat type designs
Sailing yachts 
Sailboat type designs by Bruce Kirby
Sailboat types built by Mirage Yachts